Kizhakkoth  is a village in Kozhikode district in the state of Kerala, India.

Demographics
 India census, Kizhakkoth had a population of 28316 with 13928 males and 14388 females.

Transportation
Kozhakkoth village connects to other parts of India through Calicut city on the west and Thamarassery town on the east.  National highway No.66 passes through Kozhikode and the northern stretch connects to Mangalore, Goa and Mumbai.  The southern stretch connects to Cochin and Trivandrum.  The eastern National Highway No.54 going through Adivaram connects to Kalpetta, Mysore and Bangalore. The nearest airports are at Kannur and Kozhikode.  The nearest railway station is at Kozhikode.

References

Villages in Kozhikode district
Thamarassery area